Patrick Hunt (born 1951 in California) is an American archeologist and author.

Research
Dr. Patrick Hunt has directed the Stanford University Alpine Archaeology Project since 1994. The project involves leading a team of researchers and students to the Swiss, Italian, and French Alps for various archaeological projects.

In one project, Hunt researches the history of Celtic and Roman presence in the region of the Great St Bernard Pass. In 1996 he discovered the quarry for a temple of Jupiter in the region of the pass. In 2003 he directed a team of researchers and students that discovered a hoard of Roman silver coins at an archaeological site in the Swiss Alps.

In the Hannibal Expedition 2007-2008 sponsored by National Geographic Society, Hunt searched for artifacts of Hannibal's crossing of the Alps in 218 BC, during the Second Punic War. Hunt has investigated 25 alpine passes and is favouring Col de Clapier as the most likely route.

Hunt has broken all together 30 bones in accidents in alpine research; among these is a fracture of his leg in 2002 while doing lichenological research at Bourg-Saint-Pierre in the Pennine Alps, and some smaller fractures since.

He has been a Fellow of the Royal Geographical Society since 1989. Hunt's latest publications also deal with the artists Rembrandt and Caravaggio.

In 2011, he was the expert on the Hannibal team for Spike's TV show Deadliest Warrior.

Works
Monographs
 Caravaggio (Life & Times), 2004, 
 Rembrandt: His Life in Art, 2006, 
 Alpine Archaeology, 2007, 
 Ten Discoveries That Rewrote History, 2007, 
 Hannibal, 2017, 

Articles
 Rembrandt and the Rembrandthuis Museum, Amsterdam
 The Role of Silenus and Isabella d’Este
 Artist David Roberts and Near Eastern Archaeology

References

External links
 Official Website (at Stanford University Dept. of Classics)
 Personal Website
 In the Alps, hunting for Hannibal's trail. Stanford Report. May 16, 2007
 Lecture on "Ten Discoveries that Rewrote History" (Video)
 Stanford Archaeolog posting by Hunt, re: the Hannibal Expedition

1951 births
American archaeologists
Living people